Lee A. Burnett is an American osteopathic physician, U.S. Army Colonel, and founder of the website Student Doctor Network.

Education
Burnett graduated from the University of California, Davis with an undergraduate degree, and completed medical school at Western University of Health Sciences. Burnett graduated from Western University of Health Sciences in 1997 completed an internship at Downey Regional Medical Center and a family medicine residency at University of California Irvine. He then served as Chief Resident in Family Medicine at the University of California, Irvine. He is certified by the American Board of Family Medicine and the American Osteopathic Board of Family Physicians.

Career
In 1995, Burnett founded the website Osteopathic.com. Originally known as "The Osteopathic Source," the website eventually became Student Doctor Network, which was launched in 1999. In 2017, Burnett was appointed to position of colonel in the US Army. From 2018-2019, Burnett commanded the 115th Field Hospital. Burnett has served two tours of duty with the US Army in Iraq and one in Afghanistan. He was the executive director at Student Doctor Network. He currently serves on the board of directors for the Health Professional Student Association.  Burnett led the 32nd Hospital Command until June 2020.

References 

Living people
American osteopathic physicians
United States Army colonels
United States Army Medical Corps officers
American primary care physicians
University of California, Davis alumni
Year of birth missing (living people)
Western University of Health Sciences alumni